Philidris jiugongshanensis is a species of ant in the genus Philidris. Described in Wang and Wu in 2007, the species is endemic to China.

References

Dolichoderinae
Insects described in 2007
Hymenoptera of Asia
Insects of China